Steffi Graf defeated Gabriela Sabatini in the final, 4–6, 6–4, 6–0, 6–4 to win the singles tennis title at the 1987 Virginia Slims Championships. This marked the eleventh career meeting between time Graf and Sabatini, with Graf winning all eleven matches.

Martina Navratilova was the five-time defending champion, but lost in the quarterfinals to Sabatini.

Seeds

  Steffi Graf (champion)
  Martina Navratilova (quarterfinals)
  Chris Evert (first round)
  Pam Shriver (quarterfinals)

Draw

See also
WTA Tour Championships appearances

References
 1987 Virginia Slims Championships Draw

Singles 1987
Singles